Aleksandar Branekov (born 31 May 1987) is a former Bulgarian professional footballer who played as a centre back.

Career
Branekov is a product of the CSKA Sofia Academy. He marked his first-team debut with goal, opening the scoring in a 2–1 away win over Lokomotiv Sofia on 6 November 2005. Branekov spent a 2007–08 season on loan with Lokomotiv Plovdiv to build up his first team experience, but earned only 7 appearances in the A Group.

In June 2008, Branekov returned to CSKA. After the game with Lokomotiv Sofia on 5 May 2010, in which Branekov scored goal for the 5–1 home win, he came into conflict with the fans and was removed from the first team. In June 2010, he was released from CSKA.

A month later, Branekov signed a contract as a free agent with Vidima-Rakovski Sevlievo and quickly established himself as a key player. During his time with Vidima, he scored 4 goals in 41 matches in the A Group.

On 1 February 2012, Branekov signed a one-and-a-half-year contract with Lokomotiv Sofia. He made his debut in a 2–0 home win over Lokomotiv Plovdiv on 5 March. In January 2013, Branekov was announced as Lokomotiv's new club captain. On 10 June 2013, he signed a two-year contract extension, keeping him at Lokomotiv until 30 June 2015. On 22 February 2014, he scored his first goal in a Lokomotiv shirt against Neftochimic Burgas, in a 5–1 home league win. On 13 March, Branekov scored the only goal in a home win over Chernomorets Burgas in the Bulgarian Cup.

On 1 July 2015, Branekov returned to his favorite club CSKA Sofia despite the fact that the team would play amateur football the following season. He had an opportunity to join the rival club Levski Sofia but he rejected the offer from them.

On 14 June 2017, Branekov joined Septemvri Sofia. He made his debut for the team on 17 July 2017 in a match against Dunav Ruse. On 31 August 2017, his contract was terminated by mutual consent.

On 4 September 2017, Branekov signed with Second League club Lokomotiv Sofia. At the end of the 2017–18 season, he announced his retirement from football. Branekov subsequently became a youth coach in Emil Velev's academy - FA Levski-Spartak 1962 in Sofia.

Personal
On 2 September 2020, Branekov was arrested for being involved in a riot during the protests against the Borisov government. He was released by the Sofia District Court after 72 hours.

Career statistics

Honours
CSKA Sofia
 Bulgarian Cup (1): 2006
 Bulgarian Supercup (1): 2008

References

External links
 
 Player Profile at guardian.touch-line.com

1987 births
Living people
Footballers from Sofia
Bulgarian footballers
PFC CSKA Sofia players
PFC Lokomotiv Plovdiv players
PFC Vidima-Rakovski Sevlievo players
FC Lokomotiv 1929 Sofia players
PFC Slavia Sofia players
FC Septemvri Sofia players
Association football central defenders
First Professional Football League (Bulgaria) players
Second Professional Football League (Bulgaria) players